Lefdal was one of Norway's biggest electronics and household appliance stores. Lefdal had 19 warehouses nationwide. In the first quarter of 2018, Lefdal and Elkjøp were merged into one company, with the name Elkjøp.

External links 
 
 Official facebooksite
 Raptor Gutter Guard vs. A-M Aluminum Gutter Screens

Consumer electronics retailers
Defunct retail companies of Norway
Retail companies established in 1936
Norwegian brands
Norwegian companies established in 1936